Dufflin is an old variety of cider apple from the County of Cornwall, England. It was included in orchard trials by Long Ashton Research Station in 1957.

Origins
In the 19th century they were known to be growing in the area around Kea near Truro.

Characteristics
This variety has a high sugar content, adding sweetness to the bittersharp flavour. Due to these equalities, it has been prized for making and blending cider. The trees are vigorous croppers and is also resistant to apple scab. It has a heavy, russeted skin and soft flesh.

In literature
Dufflin cider mentioned in a story by the Cornish writer, Sir Arthur Thomas Quiller-Couch, in his book,  "Ia, and other tales" , which was published by Bernhard Tauchnitz, Leipzig in 1896. In the story the main character: Ia Rosemundy, spills Dufflin cider on Rev Paul Heathcote, a visiting preacher.

References

Further reading
 Virginia Spiers Burcombes, Queenies and Colloggetts: the Making of a Cornish Orchard. West Brendon, 1996 , 
 Antony Gibson In Search of Cider: Cider and Cider Makers in Cornwall, Devon, Dorset and Somerset. Paperback – 8 Apr 2010

Cornish cuisine
British apples
Cider apples
Apple cultivars